George Ross Smith (May 28, 1864 – November 7, 1952) was a U.S. Representative from Minnesota.

Early life and education
He was born in St. Cloud, Stearns County, Minnesota; attended the public schools and Sauk Centre (Minnesota) Academy; was graduated from the law school of the University of Minnesota at Minneapolis in 1893.

Legal career
He was admitted to the bar in 1893 and commenced practice in Minneapolis. He became a member of the Minnesota House of Representatives in 1903, and was a judge of the probate court of Hennepin County, Minnesota from 1907 to 1913.

Political career
He elected as a Republican to the Sixty-third and Sixty-fourth Congresses (March 4, 1913 – March 3, 1917); unsuccessful candidate for reelection in 1916 to the Sixty-fifth Congress; resumed the practice of law and taught law classes at Minneapolis-Minnesota Law School.

Death
He died in Minneapolis on November 7, 1952, and was buried at St. Mary's Catholic Cemetery.

References

Minnesota Legislators Past and Present

External links

 

Republican Party members of the Minnesota House of Representatives
Minnesota state court judges
University of Minnesota Law School alumni
1864 births
1952 deaths
Republican Party members of the United States House of Representatives from Minnesota
People from St. Cloud, Minnesota